Chukti Bhar Senur is Bhojpuri film released in 1983 directed by Nasir Hussain.

See also 
 Bhojpuri Film Industry
 List of Bhojpuri films

References

External links

1983 films
Films directed by Nasir Hussain
1980s Bhojpuri-language films